Eagles Praha is a baseball team from Prague, Czech Republic. The team plays in the Czech Extraliga.

History
The club was established on 3 February 1981 in the Krč district of Prague as TJ Sokol Praha 4 – Krč. In 1984, the club built its current facilities in a piece of land in Krč. In 1991, the team changed its name to Sokol Krč. In 2000, the organization signed a sponsorship agreement with Altron and changed its name to Krč Altron in 2001. For the 2009 season, the club dropped the sponsor title and changed its name to Eagles Praha.

The Eagles have never won the Extraliga title, but were runners-up in 1999, 2004, 2012 and 2019.

Four Eagles' players were called to represent Czech Republic at the 2023 World Baseball Classic qualification: pitcher Tomáš Duffek, catcher Martin Červenka, infielder Petr Zýma and outfielder Marek Chlup.

Roster

References

External links
 Official club webpage

Baseball in the Czech Republic
Sport in Prague
Baseball teams established in 1981
1981 establishments in Czechoslovakia